Banda Assembly constituency is one of the 230 Vidhan Sabha (Legislative Assembly) constituencies of Madhya Pradesh state in central India. This constituency came into existence in 1951, as one of the Vidhan Sabha constituencies of Madhya Pradesh state.

Overview
Banda (constituency number 42) is one of the 8 Vidhan Sabha constituencies located in Sagar district. This constituency presently covers the entire Banda tehsil of the district.

Banda is part of Damoh Lok Sabha constituency along with seven other Vidhan Sabha segments, namely, Deori and Rehli in this district, Malhara in Chhatarpur district and Pathariya, Damoh, Jabera and Hatta in Damoh district.

Members of Legislative Assembly
 1951: Swami Krishnanand Ramcharan, Indian National Congress
 1957: Swami Krishnanand Ramcharan, Indian National Congress
 1962: Ramcharan Pujari, Bharatiya Jana Sangh
 1967: R.Pujari, Bharatiya Jana Sangh
 1972: Shri Krishna Selat, Indian National Congress
 1977: Shivraj Singh, Janata Party
 1980: Premnarayan Gorelal, Indian National Congress (I)
 1985: Harnam Singh Rathore, Bharatiya Janata Party
 1990: Harnam Singh Rathore, Bharatiya Janata Party
 1993: Santosh Kumar Sahu, Indian National Congress (I)
 1998: Harnam Singh Rathore, Bharatiya Janata Party
 2003: Harnam Singh Rathore, Bharatiya Janata Party
 2008: Narayan Prajapati, Indian National Congress (I)
 2013: Harvansh Singh Rathore, Bharatiya Janata Party

See also
 Sagar district

References

Sagar district
Assembly constituencies of Madhya Pradesh